The Count! is an album by pianist/bandleader Count Basie recorded in 1952 and released on the Clef label in 1955.

Reception

AllMusic awarded the album 3 stars.

Track listing
 "New Basie Blues" (Count Basie) - 3:26		
 "Sure Thing" (Neal Hefti) - 3:03		
 "Why Not?" (Hefti) - 3:31		
 "Fawncy Meetin' You" (Hefti) - 3:03
 "Bootsie" (Basie) - 3:22		
 "Tom Whaley" (Basie) - 2:56
 "Paradise Squat" (Basie) - 4:05
 "Basie Talks" (Basie) - 3:39
 "Hob Nail Boogie" (Basie) - 2:35
 "Jack and Jill" (Basie) - 2:55
 "Bunny" (Basie) - 3:09
 "Cash Box" (Basie) - 3:24
Recorded at Fine Sound Studios in New York City on  January 19 (tracks 1-4), July 22 (tracks 7-11) and July 26 (tracks 5, 6 & 12), 1952

Personnel 
Count Basie - piano, organ
Paul Campbell, Wendell Culley, Reunald Jones (tracks 5-12), Joe Newman, Charlie Shavers (tracks 1-4) - trumpet
Henry Coker, Benny Powell, Jimmy Wilkins - trombone 
Marshall Royal - alto saxophone, clarinet 
Ernie Wilkins -  alto saxophone, tenor saxophone, arranger 
Eddie "Lockjaw" Davis (tracks 5-12), Floyd Johnson (tracks 1-4), Paul Quinichette - tenor saxophone
Charlie Fowlkes - baritone saxophone
Freddie Green - guitar 
Jimmy Lewis - bass
Gus Johnson - drums
Buck Clayton (track 6), Andy Gibson, (track 11), Buster Harding (tracks 7, 9 & 12), Neal Hefti (tracks 2-4), Nat Pierce (track 1), Don Redman (track 10) - arranger

References 

1955 albums
Count Basie Orchestra albums
Clef Records albums
Verve Records albums
Albums arranged by Ernie Wilkins
Albums arranged by Neal Hefti
Albums produced by Norman Granz